Minquadale is an unincorporated community in New Castle County, Delaware, United States. It is the location of the southernmost interchange between Interstate 495 and US 13. It was the site of the Lobdell Estate, Minquadale Home. The Minquadale Community Methodist Church was built in 1943.

References

External links

Unincorporated communities in New Castle County, Delaware
Unincorporated communities in Delaware
Delaware placenames of Native American origin